Psilocurus nudiusculus is a species of robber fly in the family Asilidae.

References

Laphriinae
Articles created by Qbugbot
Insects described in 1874